M&M's Break' Em is a puzzle game for Game Boy Advance and Nintendo DS, released in 2007 by Destination Software, Inc. (DSI). where you can play as 5 different colored M&M's and try to stop Mr. Runch, a rotten and dangerous peanut, fiercely determined on being one of the M&Ms. He escaped the reject bin where he was discarded and he's on the loose in the Galaxy, where he is trying to kidnap and trap all of the M&M's into crystals until he can get what he wants: the chance to become a real M&M's candy. This game is a remake of Gem Smashers made by the same company.

Reception

The game received unfavorable reviews from critics. IGN gave the game a 5 out of 10 stars, stating that "it's nowhere near the polished effort that Gem Smashers was."

References

2007 video games
Nintendo DS games
Game Boy Advance games
Destination Software games
Video games developed in Italy
Advergames
Works based on advertisements
Video games about food and drink
M&M's
Multiplayer and single-player video games